The Seychelles skink (Trachylepis seychellensis) also known as the Mangouya, is a species of skink in the family Scincidae. It is endemic to the Seychelles.

Distribution and habitat
The Seychelles skink  is endemic to the Seychelles where it is found on islands of Mahé (and nearby islets), Silhouette, Praslin, North, Aride, Cousin, Cousine, Curieuse, La Digue, Grande Soeur, Petite Soeur, Félicité, Frégate and some other islands. It has been introduced into the Amirantes Islands in the southern Seychelles. It is common in woodland, shrubby areas, plantations, parks, gardens, mangroves and urban locations.

Ecology
Skinks are similar in appearance to other lizards but lack necks and have long tails that are easily shed. The Seychelles skink feeds on such insects as flies, crickets, grasshoppers, beetles and caterpillars. This species reproduces by producing clutches of eggs.

Status
The Seychelles skink is a very adaptable species, able to utilise the many habitats available on the Seychelles. It is present in several national parks and protected areas.

References

Skinks
Endemic fauna of Seychelles
Reptiles described in 1839
Taxa named by André Marie Constant Duméril
Taxa named by Gabriel Bibron
Taxonomy articles created by Polbot
Taxobox binomials not recognized by IUCN